Proneohelicometra is a genus of trematodes in the family Opecoelidae. It consists of one species, Proneohelicometra aegyptensis Hassanine, 2006.

References

Opecoelidae
Plagiorchiida genera
Monotypic protostome genera